The 196th Regiment Pennsylvania Volunteer Infantry, alternately the 5th Union League Regiment was an infantry regiment of the Union Army in the American Civil War. Raised in Philadelphia in mid-1864, the regiment was made up of Hundred Days Men in an effort to augment existing manpower for an all-out push to end the war within 100 days, and spent most of its service guarding Confederate prisoners of war at Camp Douglas.

History 

The regiment was organized at Camp Cadwalader near Philadelphia on 20 July 1864, under the command of printer and Volunteer officer Colonel Harmanus Neff; it had a total enrollment of 958. It was alternately known as the 5th Union League Regiment due to its being organized with the assistance of the Union League of Philadelphia. A week after its organization, on 27 July, the 196th Pennsylvania was sent to Camp Bradford at Mankin's Woods near Baltimore, attached to the 3rd Separate Brigade of VIII Corps. From there, it entrained for Chicago in mid-August, where it guarded Confederate prisoners of war at Camp Douglas. Company H was detached to perform provost duty at Springfield, Illinois on 26 August, and remained there until the end of its term. The regiment helped foil an escape on the night of 27 September by firing at outside sympathizers who had mobilized to facilitate the attempt. In early November, the regiment was sent back to Philadelphia, and left for brief service at Fort Delaware on 5 November. It was mustered out at Philadelphia on 17 November, having lost ten men to disease during its service.

Notable personnel 
Future baseball player Ned Cuthbert served with the regiment as a private in Company F.

See also 

 List of Pennsylvania Civil War regiments
 Pennsylvania in the Civil War

References

Citations

Bibliography

External links 

 196th Pennsylvania Rosters

Military units and formations established in 1864
Military units and formations disestablished in 1864
Units and formations of the Union Army from Pennsylvania